Philippe Deroche (born 11 September 1954) is a French athlete. He competed in the men's long jump at the 1976 Summer Olympics and the 1980 Summer Olympics.

References

1954 births
Living people
Athletes (track and field) at the 1976 Summer Olympics
Athletes (track and field) at the 1980 Summer Olympics
French male long jumpers
Olympic athletes of France
Place of birth missing (living people)
Mediterranean Games silver medalists for France
Mediterranean Games medalists in athletics
Athletes (track and field) at the 1979 Mediterranean Games
20th-century French people
21st-century French people